Shurok-e Hajji (also Romanized as Shūrok-e Ḩājjī, Shūrak-e Hājī, Shūrak-e Ḩājjī, and Shūrak Hājī) is a village in Shirin Darreh Rural District, in the Central District of Quchan County, Razavi Khorasan Province, Iran. At the 2006 census, its population was 410, in 95 families.

It is close to the Qucan-Bejgiran road.

References 

Populated places in Quchan County